Ali Yar (also Romanized as ‘Alī Yār; also known as ‘Alī Yār-e Dowrāb, ‘Alī Yār-e Dūrāb, Shīr Kosh, and Shīrkoshābād) is a village in Qaleh-ye Khvajeh Rural District, in the Central District of Andika County, Khuzestan Province, Iran. At the 2006 census, its population was 92, in 13 families.

References 

Populated places in Andika County